The Dezell House is a historic house located at 328 East 8th Street in Greensboro, Florida. The house retains a high degree of its historic integrity.

Description and history 
The Prairie Style house was completed in 1919, and is distinguished by its prominent horizontal lines, broad eaves on a complex hip roof with dormers on each of the four elevations radiating from the roof peak. On May 10, 2006, it was added to the National Register of Historic Places.

References

External links
 Weekly List Of Actions Taken On Properties: 5/08/06 Through 5/12/06 at National Register of Historic Places

Houses in Gadsden County, Florida
Houses on the National Register of Historic Places in Florida
National Register of Historic Places in Gadsden County, Florida
Prairie School architecture in Florida
Houses completed in 1912
1912 establishments in Florida